Bifidobacterium breve is a bacterial species of the genus Bifidobacterium which has probiotic properties. Bifidobacteria are a type of bacteria that live symbiotically in the intestines of humans. They have been used to treat a number of conditions including constipation, diarrhea, irritable bowel syndrome and even the cold and flu. Some of these uses have been backed up by scientific research, but others have not. B. breve is a gram positive, anaerobic, rod shaped organism that is non motile and forms branches with its neighbors.

Clinical Uses 
B. breve has been researched and linked to a number of conditions. Bifidobacterium breve administered in combination with prebiotics or other probiotics and standard therapy has shown some beneficial effect. B. breve is a constituent in the therapeutic, nutritional treatment of IBD. This proprietary, standardized, formulation of live bacteria is used to treat ulcerative colitis and may require a prescription. Taking Bifidobacteria in combination with Lactobacillus and normal Helicobacter pylori therapy makes the treatment twice as effective while reducing the negative side effects. Bifidobacteria can also be used to treat IBS as well, reducing pain, bloating and constipation.

B. breve may be linked to chronic obesity. A growing pool of evidence suggests that variations in the human gut microbiome correlate with excess weight gain. B.breve is a strong candidate for research concerning this issue. A study conducted by Bioscience of Microbiota, Food and Heath(BMFH) suggests that treating pre-obese patients with the B-3 strain of B. breve may stop or reverse obesity. However larger studies need to be performed to confirm these results.

Bifidobacteria and its link to stomach health are being researched along with its link to the brain through the microbiota gut–brain axis. Strain A1 of B. Breve has undergone research concerning its effect on Alzheimer's. This research has consisted of mouse trials, and to date, shows promise in slowing or reversing the disease.

History 
B. breve strains were originally isolated from the feces of human infants. In 1971, Bifidobacterium parvulorum and Bifidobacterium breve were merged under the name Bifidobacterium breve. Bifidobacterium breve administered in combination with prebiotics, probiotics and standard therapy has showed some beneficial effect on gut health. B. breve is a constituent in the therapeutic, nutritional treatment of IBD. This proprietary, standardized, formulation of live bacteria is used to treat ulcerative colitis and may require a prescription.

Characteristics 
B. breve strains can ferment mannitol and sorbitol, but not arabinose or xylose.

References

External links
Type strain of Bifidobacterium breve at BacDive -  the Bacterial Diversity Metadatabase

Probiotics
Bifidobacteriales
Bacteria described in 2002